Los Dos Bros is a British television comedy about two half-brothers (Darren Boyd and Cavan Clerkin)  who find themselves in a series of strange situations. They discuss their experiences back to a psychiatrist (Vicki Pepperdine).

The series started life as a Comedy Lab episode in 1999, this formed the basis of a pilot. Two years later a series consisting of six episodes were broadcast. The series was produced by Talkback Productions company for Channel 4.

Episodes 
Comedy Lab: Los Dos Bros - This was the pilot episode broadcast as part of the Comedy Lab series.
Test Drive - The half-brothers test drive a red monster truck. Things take a turn for the worse as they find themselves on the M25.
Love and Teeth - The brothers take a trip to the dentist. One of the brothers finds himself falling in love with a female dentist whilst the other brother suffers from a phobia of dentists.
Date - The half-brothers try to have sex. One brother dates a girl whilst the other ends up babysitting her son.
Money - The duo go shopping. One brother has money due to having a job, the other does not and ends up envying his wealth.
Camp - The brothers take some time away from each other to gain independence. The boys hitchhike. One brother ends up camping in a field were a car boot sale takes place, the other gets a job working in a burger van. The two are reunited at the end and meet some European ladies who give them magic mushrooms to try.
Music - One brother joins a rock band as a bass guitarist, unfortunately the band do not like him. The other brother becomes jealous and lonely.

External links 
 

Channel 4 sitcoms
1999 British television series debuts
2001 British television series endings
Television series about brothers
1990s British sitcoms
2000s British sitcoms
Psychotherapy in fiction
E4 sitcoms
Television shows set in London